Harry Doxtader was a member of the Wisconsin State Assembly.

Biography
Doxtader was born on November 3, 1827 in Oppenheim, New York. Later, he lived in Iron Ridge, Wisconsin for a time before settling in Tomah (town), Wisconsin in 1861. He died in 1907.

Career
Doxtader was a member of the Assembly during the 1877 session. Additionally, he was Chairman of the Board of Tomah in 1876 and Assessor of Tomah in 1875. He was a Republican.

References

People from Fulton County, New York
People from Iron Ridge, Wisconsin
People from Tomah, Wisconsin
Mayors of places in Wisconsin
Republican Party members of the Wisconsin State Assembly
1827 births
1907 deaths
Burials in Wisconsin
19th-century American politicians